is a Japanese football player.

Club career

Mito HollyHock
Funatani left Mito HollyHock at the end of 2018. This was announced on 3 December 2018.

FC Maruyasu Okazaki
On 7 February 2019, Funatani joined FC Maruyasu Okazaki.

National team career
In June 2005, Funatani was selected Japan U-20 national team for 2005 World Youth Championship. But he did not play in the match.

Club statistics
Updated to 23 February 2020.

References

External links

1986 births
Living people
Association football people from Mie Prefecture
People from Matsusaka, Mie
Japanese footballers
Japan youth international footballers
J1 League players
J2 League players
Japan Football League players
Júbilo Iwata players
Sagan Tosu players
Mito HollyHock players
FC Maruyasu Okazaki players
Association football midfielders